Ostrów Królewski is a village in the administrative district of Gmina Rzezawa, within Bochnia County, Lesser Poland Voivodeship, in southern Poland.

The village has a population of 325.

References

Villages in Bochnia County